Melissa Ng Mei-hang (born 5 May 1972) is a retired American Hong Kong television actress born in China. She had been under contract to the television station TVB since 1996 after coming second in the Miss Chinese International Pageant, retiring from acting in 2007. Ng speaks fluent English with an American accent, Cantonese, and Mandarin. She currently resides in Hong Kong.

Early life and family
Ng was born in Guangdong, China, where both her parents were doctors. She and her family immigrated to San Francisco, California,  when Ng was nine years old. Ng has two elder sisters and a younger sister. In 2007, Ng revealed that she has been married to a Taiwanese businessman since 2001. They have 2 children.

Acting career

After graduating with a major in international relations and a minor in marketing at San Francisco State University, Ng entered the Hong Kong entertainment industry in 1996, after placing 1st runner up in Miss Chinese International 1996; she represented San Francisco after she won Miss Chinatown USA in 1992.

She began playing minor guest roles before quickly being offered the second female lead in the late 1990s gaining popularity quickly. In early to late 2000s, she played a number of diverse female lead roles in many popular and critically acclaimed TVB series with positive reviews and praise from audiences. Her many series include A Kindred Spirit, The Legend of Lady Yang, Secret of the Heart, Riches and Stitches, A Herbalist Affair, Healing Hands III, Into Thin Air. Her 2006 series La Femme Desperado and Love Guaranteed received the best and 4th best TVB series ratings of the year respectively with the first winning the TVB Anniversary Award for Best Series.

In 2007, she confirmed the rumours that she had been married since 2001 and that she was expecting her first child, which led to her having to pull out of filming several series while on maternity leave. In 2008, while promoting The Master of Tai Chi, she stated that she plans to return and continue filming for TVB very soon. It was later confirmed by TVB that she ultimately made the decision to retire from acting and focus on her family. She has since kept a low profile.

Pageant career
Ng was crowned Miss Chinatown USA 1992. After winning the Miss Chinatown USA Pageant based in the city of San Francisco, she represented San Francisco at Miss Chinese International 1996. Ng had an interview during the final night, where she challenged Eric Tsang, and was later crowned as 1st runner up. Due to her strong Cantonese and communication skills, she earned a contract with TVB. Ng was one of the emcee's for the 2002 Miss Chinese International Pageant.

Filmography

Awards 
 1996 Miss Chinese International Pageant: First Runner Up
 1992 Miss Chinatown USA Winner

References

External links

1972 births
Living people
Actresses from Guangdong
Hong Kong emigrants to the United States
Hong Kong television actresses
San Francisco State University alumni
TVB veteran actors
Chinese television actresses
20th-century Chinese actresses
21st-century Chinese actresses
20th-century Hong Kong actresses
21st-century Hong Kong actresses